Renata Vanni (October 12, 1909 – February 19, 2004) was an Italian-born American film actress. She was better known for the films Pay or Die, A Patch of Blue and Lady in White.

Filmography

 El Paso (1949) as Lupita Montez (uncredited)
 The Doctor and the Girl (1949) as Mrs. Crisani, Tony's Mother (uncredited)
 Stop That Cab (1951) as Josephine Moscadella
 Strictly Dishonorable  (1951) as Mrs. Peccatori (uncredited)
 Westward the Women (1951) as Mrs. Moroni
 When in Rome (1952) as Mrs. Maroni (uncredited)
 Trouble Along the Way (1953) as Maria's Italian Mother (uncredited)
 The Command (1954) as Mrs. Pellegrini (uncredited)
 Three Coins in the Fountain (1954) as Anna (uncredited)
 The Seven Little Foys (1955) as Ballerina Mistress in Milan (uncredited)
 It's Always Fair Weather (1955) as Mother (uncredited)
 Hell on Frisco Bay (1955) as Anna Amato
 Serenade (1956) as Village Woman (uncredited)
 The Man in the Gray Flannel Suit (1956) as Italian Farmer's Wife (uncredited)
 Somebody Up There Likes Me (1956) Minor Role (uncredited)
 Four Girls in Town (1957) as Rosa (uncredited)
 Ten Thousand Bedrooms (1957) as Maid (uncredited)
 The Midnight Story (1957) as Señora Bergatina (uncredited)
 The Hard Man (1957) as Juanita
 The Walter Winchell File (1958, TV Series) as Maria
 The Beat Generation (1959) as Mrs. Rosa Costa (uncredited)
 The Jayhawkers! (1959) as Indian Woman 
 Pay or Die (1960) as Mom Saulino
 Frontier Uprising (1961) as Augustina
 The Greatest Story Ever Told (1965) as Weeping Woman (uncredited)
 A Patch of Blue (1965) as Mrs. Favaloro
 Bob & Carol & Ted & Alice (1969) as Chianti Woman (uncredited)
 A Dream of Kings (1969) as Mrs. Falconis
 The Last Porno Flick (1974) as Concetta
 Murder in the First Person Singular (1974, TV Movie) as Mrs. Montopollis
 Once Is Not Enough (1975) as Maria
 I Will... I Will... For Now (1976) as Receptionist
 Fatso (1980) as Zi Marie
 The Idolmaker (1980) as Mrs. Bevaloqua
 Margin for Murder (1981, TV Movie) as Mama De Fellita
 Frank Nitti: The Enforcer (1988, TV Movie)
 Lady in White (1988) as Mama Assunta
 Wait Until Spring, Bandini (1989) as Donna Toscana (final film role)

References

Bibliography
 Pitts, Michael R. Western Movies: A Guide to 5,105 Feature Films. McFarland, 2012.

External links

1909 births
2004 deaths
American film actresses
American television actresses
Italian film actresses
Italian television actresses
Italian emigrants to the United States
Actresses from Naples
20th-century American actresses
21st-century American women